Margarites striatus, common name the striate margarite, is a species of sea snail, a marine gastropod mollusk in the family Margaritidae.

Description
The size of the shell varies between 13 mm and 19 mm.

Distribution
This species occurs in European waters and in the Northwest Atlantic Ocean; in the Arctic Pacific Ocean at depths between 0 m and 22 m.

References

 Leach, W. E. 1819. Descriptions des nouvelles espèces d'Animaux découvertes par le vaisseau Isabelle dans un voyage au pôle boréal. Journal de Physique, de Chimie, et d'Histoire Naturelle 88: 462–467.
 Couthouy, J. P. 1838. Descriptions of new species of Mollusca and shells, and remarks on several polypi found in Massachusetts Bay. Boston Journal of Natural History 2: 53–111, pls. 1–3
 Sowerby, G. B., I. 1838. A descriptive catalogue of the species of Leach's genus Margarita. Malacological and Conchological Magazine 1: 23–27.
 Möller, H. P. C. 1842. Index molluscorum Groenlandiae. Naturhistorisk Tidsskrift 4: 76–97. 
 Middendorff, A. T. von. 1849. Beiträge zu einer Malacozoologia Rossica. II. Aufzählung und Beschreibung der zur Meeresfauna Russlands gehörigen einschaler. Mémoires de l'Académie Impériale des Sciences de Saint-Pétersbourg, Sciences Naturelles (6)6: 329–516, pls. 1–11. 
 Mörch, O. A. L. 1857. Fortegnelse over Grønlands Bløddyr. Grønland Geographisk og Statistisk Beskrevet 2: 75–100 Commission hos Universitetsboghandler: Kjøbenhavn.
 Jeffreys, J. G. 1865. British conchology. British Conchology 3: [ii] + 393 pp., frontispiece, 8 pls. John Van Voorst: London
 Leche, W. 1878. Öfversigt öfver de af Svenska Expeditionerna till Novaja Semlja och Jenissej 1875 och 1876 Insamlade: Hafs-Mollusker. Kongliga Svenska Vetenskaps-Akademiens Handlingar (2)16(2): 1–86, pls. 1–2.
 Turgeon, D.D., et al. 1998. Common and scientific names of aquatic invertebrates of the United States and Canada. American Fisheries Society Special Publication 26
 Trott, T.J. 2004. Cobscook Bay inventory: a historical checklist of marine invertebrates spanning 162 years. Northeastern Naturalist (Special Issue 2): 261 – 324.
 Kantor Yu.I. & Sysoev A.V. (2006) Marine and brackish water Gastropoda of Russia and adjacent countries: an illustrated catalogue. Moscow: KMK Scientific Press. 372 pp. + 140 pls. page(s): 35
 BODC (2009). Species list from the British Oceanographic Data Centre

striatus
Gastropods described in 1841